The Portugal national under-15 football team represents Portugal in international football at this age level and is controlled by Federação Portuguesa de Futebol, the governing body for football in Portugal. They are also known as the Portugal Youth Team.

Honours
CONCACAF Under-15 Championship: 2019
Nations Cup: 2019

References

See also 
 Portugal national football team

European national under-15 association football teams
F